Arthur Malet (24 September 1927 – 18 May 2013) was an English stage, film and television actor based in the United States. He was known for his films Mary Poppins, Halloween, The Secret of NIMH, and Hook. His last film was The Secret of NIMH 2: Timmy to the Rescue in which he did the voice for Mr. Ages.

Life and career
Vivian Arthur Rivers Malet was born on 24 September 1927 in Lee-on-the-Solent, Hampshire, England, the son of Henry Guy Rivers Malet and Olga Muriel Balfour; a scion of the Malet baronets. He emigrated to the United States in the 1950s, changed his forename to Arthur, began acting onstage, and won two Drama Desk Awards in 1957. He came to some prominence in 1960s films, often playing characters much older than his real age, such as Mr. Dawes, Jr., in Disney's Mary Poppins (1964), and King Eidilleg in Disney's 1985 animated film The Black Cauldron.

He played undertaker Ted Ulam in Norman Jewison's 1967 film In the Heat of the Night, and Joe Fenwick in a 1972 episode of Columbo, "Dagger of the Mind". He went on to play a village elder in Mel Brooks's Young Frankenstein in 1974, the graveyard keeper in John Carpenter's Halloween in 1978, a houseman in the 1984 film Oh God, You Devil,  Tootles in 1991's Hook, and Owen Owens in the 1992 film Toys.

His appearances on television included episodes of The Donna Reed Show, The Rifleman, Adventures in Paradise, The Alfred Hitchcock Hour ("The McGregor Affair"; originally aired 23 November 1964), and Bewitched ("The Trial and Error of Aunt Clara"; originally aired 2 February 1967), Wonder Woman and Dallas. In 1965 he appeared as murder victim Ralph Day in the Perry Mason episode, "The Case of the Golden Venom." He played a vagrant who claimed to have stolen Aunt Bea's pin on The Andy Griffith Show in 1966. In 1969 Malet appeared as the Night Clerk on the TV Series The Virginian in the episode titled "Journey to Scathelock." In 1995, he portrayed Charles Randolph in A Little Princess. In 1997, he did voice work in Anastasia. He voiced the character of "Mr. Ages" in The Secret of NIMH in 1982 and reprised the role in The Secret of NIMH 2: Timmy to the Rescue in 1998. Malet had a regular role on the short-lived 1983 TVseries adaptation of the film Casablanca.

Death
Malet died on 18 May 2013 at age 85, in Vigeois, Correze, Nouvelle-Aquitaine, France.

Filmography

Convicts 4 (1962) as Storekeeper
The Man from Galveston (1963) as Barney
Mary Poppins (1964) as Mr. Dawes, Jr.
King Rat (1965) as Blakeley
Munster, Go Home! (1966) as Alfie
Lt. Robin Crusoe, U.S.N. (1966) as Umbrella Man
Penelope (1966) as Major Higgins
 The Scorpio Letters (1967) as Hinton
The Adventures of Bullwhip Griffin (1967) as Chinese Food Eater (uncredited)
In the Heat of the Night (1967) as Ulam
The Helicopter Spies (1968) as White Hunter
The Great White Hope (1970) as Barrister (uncredited)
Vanishing Point (1971) as Second Male Hitchhiker
Bedknobs and Broomsticks (1971) as Mr. Widdenfield - Museum Guard (restored version) (uncredited)
The Culpepper Cattle Co. (1972) as Doctor
Ace Eli and Rodger of the Skies (1973) as Brother Watson
Young Frankenstein (1974) as Village Elder
The Enforcer (1976) as Innocent Bystander in Opening Action Sequence (uncredited)
Monster Squad (1976) as The Wizard
Heaven Can Wait (1978) as Everett
Halloween (1978) as Graveyard Keeper
Disaster on the Coastliner (1979) as the Conductor of Southbound 3
Savage Harvest (1981) as MacGruder
The Secret of NIMH (1982) as Mr. Ages (voice)
Oh, God! You Devil (1984) as Houseman
City Heat (1984) as Doc Loomis
The Black Cauldron (1985) as King Eidilleg (voice)
Worth Winning (1989) as Ticket Taker
Dick Tracy (1990) as Diner Patron
Beastmaster 2: Through the Portal of Time (1991) as Wendel
The Runestone (1991) as Stoddard
Hook (1991) as Tootles
Toys (1992) as Owen Owens
Felidae (1994) as Jesaja (voice) (uncredited)
A Little Princess (1995) as Charles Randolph
Anastasia (1997) as Travelling Man / Major Domo (voice)
The Secret of NIMH 2: Timmy to the Rescue (1998) as Mr. Ages (voice) (final film role)

References

External links

1927 births
2013 deaths
20th-century English male actors
21st-century English male actors
Drama Desk Award winners
English emigrants to the United States
English male film actors
English male stage actors
English male television actors
English male voice actors
Male actors from Hampshire
People from Gosport